Alex Dimitriades (born 28 December 1973) is an Australian actor and DJ. He is perhaps best known for his roles as Nick Polides in the 1993 romantic comedy film The Heartbreak Kid, and Nick Poulos in the 1994 television teen drama spin-off Heartbreak High.

Early life
Dimitriades was born in Sydney, as Alexandros Dimitriades. He is the son of first generation Greek immigrants and the youngest of three siblings. He has a brother, George, and a sister, Melinda. He grew up in Earlwood, Sydney. His parents divorced when he was 12. His mother worked as a legal secretary, and she raised the children as a single mother.

Career

Film

Dimitriades first attracted national attention for his co-starring role as Nick Polides in the 1993 Australian romantic comedy film The Heartbreak Kid, for which he received positive reviews and acclaim.

In 1998, he played the protagonist Ari in the Ana Kokkinos film Head On, based on the book Loaded by Christos Tsiolkas. Dimitriades' performance in the role was critically acclaimed and earned him an AFI Award nomination. The film was controversial for its graphic violence, sex scenes and LGBT subject matter, but it earned mostly positive reviews. It screened at dozens of festivals around the world, including the Director's Fortnight at the 1998 Cannes Film Festival.

His other film roles include the Australian comedies Let's Get Skase (2001) and La Spagnola (2001), the Greek film To Gamilio Party (English title Bang Bang Wedding, 2008), Wog Boy 2: Kings of Mykonos (2010), and Summer Coda starring alongside Rachael Taylor. He had roles in the Hollywood films Ghost Ship (2002) and Deuce Bigalow: European Gigolo (2005).

In 2015, he co-starred in Ruben Guthrie with Patrick Brammall.

Television
After making his acting debut in the film The Heartbreak Kid, he starred in a television spin-off Heartbreak High, in which he played Nick Poulos. He went on to play underworld figure, Warren Lanfranchi, in the 1995 drama television series Blue Murder. The following year, Dimitriades played estate agent Steve George in the television soap opera Neighbours. In 1997, he took a role in the police drama Wildside.

In 2002, he appeared in Young Lions. In years to follow, he had a small guest role in the Australian science fiction series Farscape. In 2008, Dimitriades starred in the drama series Underbelly.

In 2011, he featured in The Slap, the TV adaptation of the novel of the same name by Christos Tsiolkas. He was awarded the AACTA Award for Best Lead Actor in a Television Drama for his role as the protagonist Harry. In 2015, he starred in The Principal, a SBS four-part crime drama screened over two weeks in October, for which he won a Logie Award. The series received positive reviews and various accolades, including several nominations from the Australian Film Institute in 2016. He appeared in the shows Secret City and Seven Types of Ambiguity.

In late 2018, Dimitriades had a recurring role in the BBC One drama The Cry as Detective Peter Alexiades and in the Netflix series Tidelands, again playing a police officer.

In 2022, Dimitriades played the Greek gangster, Kosta, in the TV series The Tourist alongside Jamie Dornan and Danielle Macdonald.

DJ 
Dimitriades, an avid collector of vinyl records, has stated that his love of music started in childhood. He has a passion for both hip hop and dance music and has stated he is inspired by Kings Go Forth because of their "’70s sound." He works as a DJ professionally across Australia, often referred to as DJ Boogie Monster. Dimitriades has headlined and performed at numerous events, including Derby Day, and as the headline act for the relaunch of the popular South Melbourne nightclub Motel.

Although Dimitriades is primarily known as an actor, his DJ work predates his acting work: It's partly my fault, I was a DJ before I was an actor, but I wasn't known and haven't been known as one. It's two sides of me that will never go away.”

Theatre
In 1996 and 1997, Dimitriades, along with Nick Giannopoulos and Vince Colosimo, toured as part of the Wogboys comedy stage shows.

Dimitriades has appeared in many theatre productions, including two plays by Louis Nowra for Griffin Theatre Company, The Woman with Dog's Eyes (2004) and The Emperor of Sydney (2006); The Nightwatchman (2007) and Rain Man in 2010; and the Melbourne Theatre Company’s production of Glengarry Glen Ross in 2014.

Filmography

Film
 The Heartbreak Kid (1993) - Nick Polides
 Head On (1998) - Ari
 Deflated (short) (1999) 
 The Love of Lionel’s Life (TV movie) (2000) - Steve
 Let’s Get Skase (2001) - Danny D’Amato Jr
 La Spagnola (2001) - Stefano
 Ghost Ship (2002) - Santos
 Subterano (2003) - Conrad
 Go Big (TV movie) (2004) - Hamish Fitz-Herbert
 Deuce Bigalow: European Gigolo (2005) - Enzo Giarraputo
 Love Thy Neighbour (short) (2006) - Peter
 The Society Murders (TV movie) (2006) - Robert Nazaretian
 Checkpoint (short) (2006) - Theo
 Loveproof (short) (2006) 
 Stepfather of the Bride (TV movie) (2006) -  Jack
 Touched by Fellini (short) (2006) - Tony
 Three Blind Mice (2008) - Tony
 To Gamillo Party (Bang Bang Wedding!) (2008) - Iliias
 Wog Boy 2: Kings of Mykonos (2010) - Mihali 
 Summer Coda (2010) - Michael
 The People Speak Australia (documentary) (2012) - Self
 The Infinite Man (2014) - Terry
 The Orchard (short) (2014) - Saverio
 Carlotta (TV movie) (2014) - Angelo
 Ruben Guthrie (2015) - Damian
 Remembering Agatha (short) (2017) - Robert
 My Boy Oleg (short) (2018) - Ari
 Epiphany (TV movie) (2019) - Theo

Television
 Heartbreak High (1994) - Nick Poulos (38 episodes)
 What’s up Doc? (1994) - Self (1 episode)
 Fully Booked (1995) - Self (2 episodes)
 Dear Dilemma (1995) - Self (1 episode)
 Blue Murder (1995) - Warren Lanfranchi (miniseries - 2 episodes)
 G.P. (1996) - Luke Papadopoulos (1 episode)
 Neighbours (1996) - Steve George (18 episodes)
 Wildside (1998-99) - Charlie Coustos (44 episodes)
 Farscape (2000) - Lieutenant Velorek (1 episode)
 Young Lions (2002) - Det Snr Const Eddie Mercia  (miniseries - 23 episodes)
 Greeks on the Roof (2003) - Self (1 episode)
 Two Twisted (2006) - Rolly (miniseries - 1 episode)
 Love My Way (2007) - Julien (1 episode)
 Underbelly (2008) - Mr. T (5 episodes)
 Rescue Special Ops (2010) - Guy Hewitt (1 episode)
 The Slap (2011) - Harry (miniseries - 8 episodes)
 The Principal (2015) - Matt Bashir (miniseries - 4 episodes)
 Wanted (2016) - Anton Maric (2 episodes)
 Secret City (2016) - Charles Dancer (6 episodes)
 Seven Types of Ambiguity (2017) - Joe Marin (miniseries - 6 episodes)
 Wake in Fright (2017) - Doc Tydon (miniseries - 2 episodes)
 The Cry (2018) - Detective Peter Alexiades (miniseries - 4 episodes)
 Tidelands (2018) - Paul Murdoch (7 episodes)
 The End (2020) - Dr. Nikos Naoumidis (9 episodes)
 Amazing Grace (2021) - Kirk Gilbert (8 episodes)
 Total Control (2021) - Nick Pearce (6 episodes)
 The Tourist (2022) - Kostas (4 episodes)

Personal life
Dimitriades had an 8-year relationship with Terry Biviano in the late 1990s and early 2000s.

In 2008, Dimitriades was arrested driving under the influence. It was reported that he had a blood alcohol reading of .11, more than twice the legal limit in Australia. The charge resulted in the suspension of his driver's licence.

In September 2009, his mother, Betty Dimitriades, died after a long-time illness.

References

External links

Interview with Paul Fischer

1973 births
20th-century Australian male actors
21st-century Australian male actors
AACTA Award winners
Australian male film actors
Australian male soap opera actors
Australian male stage actors
Australian people of Greek descent
Living people
Logie Award winners
Male actors from Sydney